is a Japanese professional footballer who plays as an attacking midfielder for Kawasaki Frontale.

International career
Oshima was a member of the Japan U-23 national team squad which got qualification to 2016 Summer Olympics by winning the AFC U-23 Championship. In August, he was elected Japan for Olympics. At this tournament, he played all 3 matches.

After that achievement, Oshima has been called for Japan on 26 May for the 2016 Kirin Cup.

In June 2018 he was named in Japan's squad for the 2018 FIFA World Cup in Russia., although he did not figure in any of the team's four matches at the finals.

Career statistics

Club

International

Honours
Kawasaki Frontale
J1 League: 2017, 2018, 2020, 2021
Emperor's Cup: 2020
J.League Cup: 2019
Japanese Super Cup: 2019

Japan U23
AFC U-23 Championship: 2016

Individual
 J.League Best XI: 2018

References

External links
Profile at Kawasaki Frontale

1993 births
Living people
Association football people from Shizuoka Prefecture
Japanese footballers
Japan youth international footballers
Japan international footballers
J1 League players
J3 League players
Kawasaki Frontale players
J.League U-22 Selection players
Footballers at the 2014 Asian Games
Footballers at the 2016 Summer Olympics
Olympic footballers of Japan
Association football midfielders
2018 FIFA World Cup players
Asian Games competitors for Japan